Oksana Yakovlieva (born 6 October 1980) is a Ukrainian biathlete. She competed in the women's individual event at the 2002 Winter Olympics.

References

1980 births
Living people
Biathletes at the 2002 Winter Olympics
Ukrainian female biathletes
Olympic biathletes of Ukraine
Place of birth missing (living people)
Universiade gold medalists for Ukraine
Universiade silver medalists for Ukraine
Universiade medalists in biathlon
Competitors at the 2005 Winter Universiade
Competitors at the 2007 Winter Universiade